Matteo Mandorlini (born 22 October 1988) is an Italian footballer who plays as midfielder for Serie D club Flaminia.

He is the son of football coach Andrea Mandorlini, who also played as a footballer with Inter in the 1980s. His brother Davide is also a footballer.

Club career

Parma
Matteo born Mandorlini in Como, Lombardy, when his father Andrea playing for Internazionale. He started his career with Emilia–Romagna side Parma. Mandorlini has made one Serie A appearance for Parma, that being Parma's 1–0 loss to S.S. Lazio on 14 May 2006 during the 2005–06 season. That match was the last round of the season and Mandorlini substituted Damiano Ferronetti in the 84th minute.

In July 2007, he was loaned to Pavia and sold to Foligno in co-ownership deal in August 2008. He started both legs of the relegation playoffs as a midfielder in 4321/433 formation.

In June 2009, Parma bought him back and loaned to Viareggio.

Piacenza
In 2010–11 season, he returned to Parma and awarded no.27 shirt, which he also own that number in 2005–06 season. But on 31 August he was loaned to Serie B club Piacenza. He started his first start of the 2010–11 Serie B season on 16 October 2010, as right midfielder (ahead Alessandro Marchi) in 4321/433 formation. The match Piacenza defeated Crotone 1–0. In the next match he moved to left midfielder ahead Tommaso Bianchi.

Brescia
In June 2011, the last few days of 2010–11 financial year, he moved to Brescia in co-ownership deal. Parma signed Cristian Pedrinelli in exchange also in co-ownership deal. Both players 50% registration rights were valued €1.5 million. Mandorlini played 22 times in 2011–12 Serie B. In June 2012 Mandorlini left for Serie B newcomer Spezia along with Parma team-mate Raffaele Schiavi. On 31 January 2013 he was signed by Grosseto. However Grosseto still relegated to Lega Pro Prima Divisione.

In June 2013 Parma gave up the remain 50% registration rights of Mandorlini to Brescia for free; Pedrinelli also moved to Parma outright for another €80,000.

Pisa
On 18 July 2014 he was signed by Serie C club Pisa.

Pordenone
On 22 August 2015 he was signed by Pordenone in a 2-year deal.

Seregno
On 2 September 2021, he joined Serie C club Seregno.

International career
Mandorlini was a member of the Italy U17 squad at the 2005 FIFA U-17 World Championship. He was also capped for the Italy U19 team during the team's 2007 UEFA European Under-19 Football Championship elite qualification campaign, and wore the number nine shirt. 

After the tournament he never received a call-up from neither the U20 nor the U21 team. Instead, he received a call-up from the C team: Italy under-20 Lega Pro representative team, played for the team at 2008–09 Mirop Cup, but sometimes as a defender.

References

External links
 La Gazzetta dello Sport Profile 
 Football.it Profile 
 Statistics with Italian National teams 
 

1988 births
Living people
Sportspeople from Como
Footballers from Lombardy
Italian footballers
Association football midfielders
Serie A players
Serie B players
Serie C players
Serie D players
Parma Calcio 1913 players
F.C. Pavia players
A.S.D. Città di Foligno 1928 players
F.C. Esperia Viareggio players
Piacenza Calcio 1919 players
Brescia Calcio players
Spezia Calcio players
F.C. Grosseto S.S.D. players
Pisa S.C. players
Pordenone Calcio players
Calcio Padova players
U.S. 1913 Seregno Calcio players
Italy youth international footballers